Ephutomorpha ruficornis is a species of parasitoid wasp in the family Mutillidae endemic to Australia.

Defenses
Ephutomorpha ruficornis is believed to use Müllerian mimicry by mimicking the colorations of Fabriogenia species.

References

Mutillidae
Insects described in 1775
Hymenoptera of Australia